Congregation Adas Emuno is a Reform synagogue in Leonia, New Jersey.

The congregation was founded in Hoboken, New Jersey, in 1871. They moved into a new synagogue in 1873, and received a donation of a Torah scroll at that time. In 1883  they erected a small new synagogue building, with a mix of Gothic and Romanesque styles. That edifice is the oldest synagogue building still standing in New Jersey, though it was subsequently used for some years as a church, and is now a residential building.  

In 1971, the congregation moved to Leonia, to a brick building purchased from the Holy Trinity Lutheran Church.

Adas Emuno owns two cemeteries. The older, smaller one is a small section of Hoboken Cemetery (but was originally part of the adjacent Flower Hill Cemetery). The larger, and slightly more recent cemetery is sited in North Arlington, NJ, across Belleville Turnpike from the Arlington Memorial Park. Adas Emuno may have been the first organization to use that cemetery, though many Jewish organizations opened additional sections within it afterwards. While the main gate for the cemetery shows Hebrew year 5669 (generally corresponding to 1909), there are gravestones dating as early as 1899 within the section.

See also
 List of the oldest buildings in New Jersey
 United Synagogue of Hoboken
 Prince Street Synagogue

References

External links
 Synagogue website
 1883 building

German-American culture in New Jersey
German-Jewish culture in the United States
Reform synagogues in New Jersey
Religious organizations established in 1871
Synagogues completed in 1883
Buildings and structures in Hoboken, New Jersey
Religious buildings and structures in Hudson County, New Jersey
1871 establishments in New Jersey
Leonia, New Jersey